Frederick Hewitt (September 16, 1916 – September 26, 2010) was an American field hockey player. He competed in the men's tournament at the 1948 Summer Olympics.

References

External links
 

1916 births
2010 deaths
American male field hockey players
Olympic field hockey players of the United States
Field hockey players at the 1948 Summer Olympics
Sportspeople from Baltimore